The tournament in Xi'an was a new addition to the ITF Women's Circuit.

Lu Jiajing and Wang Yafan won the inaugural tournament, defeating Liang Chen and Yang Zhaoxuan in the final, 6–3, 7–6(7–2).

Seeds

Draw

References 
 Draw

Xi'an - Doubles